Hearing the Homework (Finnish: Läksyn kuulustelu) is a painting by Yrjö Ollila from 1923.

Description 
The painting measures . It was purchased in 1923 and is at the Ateneum in Helsinki.

Analysis
A schoolboy sits on a sofa, as his mother reads a book.

References 

1923 paintings
Finnish paintings
Paintings in the collection of the Ateneum